Device was an American industrial metal band started by David Draiman, frontman of the heavy metal group Disturbed, and Geno Lenardo, former guitarist of Filter. They released one album, Device, in 2013.

History

Formation and self-titled album (2012–2013)
After Disturbed went into hiatus in late 2011, frontman David Draiman announced a new side-project called Device in May 2012. He revealed that he would be working with Geno Lenardo, former guitarist for Filter for their Title of Record and Amalgamut albums, in the new side project. Draiman revealed his intention to do a project with more of an electronic sound, but in an industrial metal type way, sounding similar to Nine Inch Nails or Ministry, not dubstep.

Draiman said of the band's formation: "I was first approached by Geno Lenardo, who was working on a number of tracks for the Underworld soundtrack for the last Underworld film that came out … and he asked me if I would be interested in being a part of one of the tracks and I asked him to send me the music that he had in mind and I was able to make a really compelling and powerful song … [I] found that working with him as a songwriting partner was very easy and fluid. He's a very strong songwriter in his own right."

The band entered the studio in the beginning of June 2012, and by June 6, had already finished vocals for demo versions of five songs, "You Think You Know", "Recover", "Hunted", "Vilify", and "War of Lies".

In January 2013, Draiman confirmed the exact release dates for their self-titled album and first single. He stated that the album would be released on April 9, 2013 and the song "Vilify" would debut on the radio on February 19. He also confirmed that the album would feature guest appearances by Geezer Butler (Black Sabbath), Glenn Hughes (Deep Purple, Black Sabbath, Black Country Communion), M. Shadows (Avenged Sevenfold), Serj Tankian (System of a Down), Tom Morello (Rage Against the Machine) and Lzzy Hale (Halestorm). Draiman confirmed the track featuring Hale would be a cover of Lita Ford and Ozzy Osbourne's hit song, "Close My Eyes Forever".

The album's first single, "Vilify", was released on February 19, along with a music video and a second "behind the scenes" video.  The band also released a number of songs on the internet for streaming prior to the album's release, including "You Think You Know" on March 25, "Penance" on March 28, and "Close My Eyes Forever" on March 30.

The touring band was revealed to contain drummer Will Hunt and guitarist Virus, but did not include Lenardo. The band's first live show was confirmed to be performed the day after their album was released, at the Soul Kitchen Music Hall in Mobile, Alabama on April 10, 2013. Device appeared on the 2013 version of the Gigantour festival tour.

In a 2015 interview, Draiman stated that he has no intention of making another Device album.

Members
Studio
David Draiman – lead vocals (2012–2014)
Geno Lenardo – guitar, bass (2012–2014)

Touring
Will Hunt – drums (2013)
Virus – guitar, backing vocals (2013)

Discography

Studio albums

Singles

Music videos

Awards

Revolver Golden Gods Awards

|-
| 2013 || Device || Best New Talent || 

Loudwire Music Awards

|-
| 2013 || Device || Best New Artist || 
|-
| 2013 || "You Think You Know" || Cage Match Hall of Fame ||

References

American alternative metal musical groups
American industrial metal musical groups
Hard rock musical groups from Texas
Heavy metal musical groups from Texas
Musical groups established in 2012
Musical groups disestablished in 2014
2012 establishments in Texas